Kat & Roman Kostrzewski ("Kat & RK") was a Polish thrash metal band formed by Roman Kostrzewski and Ireneusz Loth after they had left their original band KAT in 2004. Most of the fanbase of KAT views Kat & Roman Kostrzewski as its rightful successor, mainly due to the characteristic vocals of Roman, his lyrics and choice to sing in Polish as in most of KAT's original albums.

Since 2004 the group has toured extensively through Poland, while composing material for their first album Biało-czarna" (White-and-black), which was released in April 2011 by Mystic Production. The first samples off the new album were released in late 2010.

On February 10, 2022, Roman Kostrzewski died from cancer at the age of 61.

Band members

 Final lineup
Roman Kostrzewski – vocals 
Michał Laksa – bass 
Krzysztof "Pistolet" Pistelok – guitar 
Jacek Hiro – guitar 
Jacek Nowak – drums 

 Former members
Ireneusz Loth – drums 
Piotr Radecki – guitar 
Waldemar "Valdi" Moder – guitar 
Paweł "Bajtel" Pasek – guitar 

 Live members
Krzysztof "Fazi" Oset – bass 
Jarosław Niemiec – bass 

 Session musicians
 Piotr "Pienał" Pęczek – drums

Discography

Studio albums

Video albums

References

2004 establishments in Poland
2022 disestablishments in Poland
Polish thrash metal musical groups
Mystic Production artists
Musical quintets
Musical groups established in 2004
Musical groups disestablished in 2022